Vitta usnea is a species of freshwater snail with an operculum, an aquatic gastropod mollusk in the family Neritidae, the nerites.

Distribution
Vitta usnea, (common name olive nerite) is a euryhaline organism living at salinities ranging from 0 to 19 ppt. It feeds on epiphytic and epibenthic algae. It ranges from north Florida on the Atlantic Coast through the coastal waters of the Gulf of Mexico and the Caribbean Sea to Trinidad (Russell, 1941).

Vitta usnea lives in shallow protected bays from just above high water to approximately 1.5 meters in depth where it is found on sea grasses, emergent marsh plants, rocks, and stumps. It is known to climb up marsh grass blades at high tide to avoid predators. One such predator is the blue crab, Callinectes sapidus.

Life cycle 
The life span is 3–5 years in an aquarium.

Human use
This species is used as algae-eating snail among freshwater aquarists. In an aquarium, the shell of this species grows 1.3-2.5 cm. This snail prefers an aquarium temperature of 22.2-25.6 °C.

References

 Eichhorst T.E. (2016). Neritidae of the world. Volume 2. Harxheim: Conchbooks. pp. 696–1366

External links
 Röding, P.F. (1798). Museum Boltenianum sive Catalogus cimeliorum e tribus regnis naturæ quæ olim collegerat Joa. Fried Bolten, M. D. p. d. per XL. annos proto physicus Hamburgensis. Pars secunda continens Conchylia sive Testacea univalvia, bivalvia & multivalvia. Trapp, Hamburg. viii, 199 pp
 Morelet, A. (1849). Testacea novissima insulae Cubanae et Americae Centralis, Pars I. Paris: Baillière. 31 pp
 Reeve, L. A. (1855-1856). Monograph of the genus Neritina. In: Conchologia Iconica, or, illustrations of the shells of molluscous animals, vol. 9, pls 1-37 and unpaginated text. L. Reeve & Co., London.
 Adams, C. B. (1851). Descriptions of new freshwater shells which inhabit Jamaica. Contributions to Conchology. 9: 174-175
 Czaja, A.; Meza-Sánchez, I. G.; Estrada-Rodríguez, J. L.; Romero-Méndez, U.; Sáenz-Mata, J.; Ávila-Rodríguez, V.; Becerra-López, J. L.; Estrada-Arellano, J. R.; Cardoza-Martínez, G. F.; Aguillón-Gutiérrez, D. R.; Cordero-Torres, D. G.; Covich, A. P. (2020). The freshwater snails (Mollusca: Gastropoda) of Mexico: updated checklist, endemicity hotspots, threats and conservation status. Revista Mexicana de Biodiversidad. 91: e912909

Neritidae
Gastropods described in 1798